The Lithographic limestones Formation is a geologic formation in France. It preserves fossils dating back to the Jurassic period.

See also

 List of fossiliferous stratigraphic units in France

References
 

Limestone formations
Jurassic France
Geologic formations of France